Léon Crémière ( in Paris – 1913), was a French photographer. He made numerous portraits of military men, and of animals.

Life 
Léon Crémière started as an assistant to André-Adolphe-Eugène Disdéri, before opening his own studio in Paris in 1862, specialising in the photography of hunting dogs and horses.

Working from his studio at 28 Rue Laval, he became the house photographer and publisher for Napoleon III in 1866. He used the pen-name "de Lazare".

He published photographic collections, and in 1866 founded Le Centaure, a weekly illustrated magazine of sport, hunting, farming and arts, which was published until 1868. The published etchings were created from photographs. The illustrator Crafty published several drawings, and his first two collections Snob à Paris and Snob à l'Exposition were published by Crémière in 1866 and 1867.

In 1882, he became editor of Le Chenil, a newspaper published by Lemercier. The same year, he published the Stud Book Continental (SBC), which was superseded in 1885 by the Livre des origines français ("Book of French Pedigrees") of the Société Centrale Canine.

Publications  

  With an introduction by Jean-Emmanuel Le Couteulx de Canteleu

References

External links 

 

19th-century French photographers
French newspaper editors
Portrait photographers
Landscape photographers
Hunting in art
1831 births
1913 deaths